Ivo Danilevič (born April 10, 1970 in Jablonec nad Nisou) is a Czech bobsledder who has competed since 1996. Competing in three Winter Olympics, he earned his best finish of 12th in the four-man event at Vancouver in 2010.

Danilevič also earned his best finish ninth in the two-man event at the 2007 FIBT World Championships in St. Moritz.

References
 
 Ivo Danilevič profile at Sportovci.cz 
 Ivo Danilevič profile at Sports Reference
 2002 bobsleigh two-man results
 2006 bobsleigh two-man results
 2006 bobsleigh four-man results

1970 births
Bobsledders at the 2002 Winter Olympics
Bobsledders at the 2006 Winter Olympics
Bobsledders at the 2010 Winter Olympics
Czech male bobsledders
Living people
Olympic bobsledders of the Czech Republic
Sportspeople from Jablonec nad Nisou